Brad Gilbert was the defending champion, but lost in the quarterfinals to MaliVai Washington.

Andre Agassi won the title by defeating Derrick Rostagno 6–2, 1–6, 6–3 in the final.

Seeds

Draw

Finals

Top half

Bottom half

References

External links
 Official results archive (ATP)
 Official results archive (ITF)

1991 ATP Tour
1991 Singles